Piko may refer to:

PIKO, a model train manufacturer
Street name for Methamphetamine in many Central and Eastern European countries
Piko Interactive, an American game developer and publisher.
Piko (singer) (b. 1988), a Japanese pop singer
Piko (Filipino game), a Filipino children's game similar to hopscotch
Piko, renamed Penny in English dubbing, a character from the anime Stitch!
Piko (wrestler), a Japanese professional wrestler

See also
Pico (disambiguation)